The 1992 James Madison Dukes football team was an American football team that represented James Madison University during the 1992 NCAA Division I-AA football season as an independent. In their second year under head coach Rip Scherer, the team compiled a 4–7 record.

Schedule

References

James Madison
James Madison Dukes football seasons
James Madison Dukes football